James Alasdair Duff (born 26 January 1989 in Inverness, Scotland) is a Scottish professional association football plays as a centre back for Rothes.

Duff broke into the Inverness Caledonian Thistle first team during the early part of the 2008–09 season, making his senior début in a 1–0 defeat by Hamilton Academical. He signed for Elgin City in 2010. Duff left Elgin after six years, signing for Highland Football League side Brora Rangers in November 2016.

Duff represented the Scotland under–21 level team for the first time in a 3–1 defeat against Northern Ireland in November 2008.

Career statistics 

A.  The "Other" column constitutes appearances (including substitutes) and goals in the Scottish Challenge Cup.

References

External links 

1989 births
Living people
Association football defenders
Inverness Caledonian Thistle F.C. players
Elgin City F.C. players
Brora Rangers F.C. players
Rothes F.C. players
Scotland under-21 international footballers
Scottish footballers
Scottish Premier League players
Scottish Football League players
Scottish Professional Football League players